Thyone , also known as , is a retrograde irregular satellite of Jupiter. It was discovered by a team of astronomers from the University of Hawaii led by Scott S. Sheppard in 2001, and given the temporary designation .

Thyone is about 4 kilometres in diameter, and orbits Jupiter at an average distance of 21,605,000 kilometres in 603.58 days, at an inclination of 147.28° to the ecliptic (146.93° to Jupiter's equator) with an eccentricity of 0.2526. Its average orbital speed is 2.43 km/s.

It was named in August 2003 after Thyone, better known as Semele, mother of Dionysus in Greek mythology.

Thyone belongs to the Ananke group, retrograde irregular moons which orbit Jupiter between 19.3 and 22.7 million kilometres, at inclinations of roughly 150°.

References

Ananke group
Moons of Jupiter
Discoveries by Scott S. Sheppard
Irregular satellites
20011211
Moons with a retrograde orbit